Mass spectrometry is a scientific technique for measuring the mass-to-charge ratio of ions. It is often coupled to chromatographic techniques such as gas- or liquid chromatography and has found widespread adoption in the fields of analytical chemistry and biochemistry where it can be used to identify and characterize small molecules and proteins (proteomics). The large volume of data produced in a typical mass spectrometry experiment requires that computers be used for data storage and processing. Over the years, different manufacturers of mass spectrometers have developed various proprietary data formats for handling such data which makes it difficult for academic scientists to directly manipulate their data. To address this limitation, several open, XML-based data formats have recently been developed by the Trans-Proteomic Pipeline at the Institute for Systems Biology to facilitate data manipulation and innovation in the public sector. These data formats are described here.

Open formats

JCAMP-DX
This format was one of the earliest attempts to supply a standardized file format for data exchange in mass spectrometry. JCAMP-DX was initially developed for infrared spectrometry. JCAMP-DX is an ASCII based format and therefore not very compact even though it includes standards for file compression. JCAMP was officially released in 1988. Together with the American Society for Mass Spectrometry a JCAMP-DX format for mass spectrometry was developed with aim to preserve legacy data.

ANDI-MS or netCDF
The Analytical Data Interchange Format for Mass Spectrometry is a format for exchanging data. Many mass spectrometry software packages can read or write ANDI files. ANDI is specified in the ASTM E1947 Standard. ANDI is based on netCDF which is a software tool library for writing and reading data files. ANDI was initially developed for chromatography-MS data and therefore was not used in the proteomics gold rush where new formats based on XML were developed.

AnIML 
AnIML is a joined effort of IUPAC and ASTM International to create an XML based standard that covers a wide variety of analytical techniques including mass spectrometry.

mzData
mzData was the first attempt by the Proteomics Standards Initiative (PSI) from the Human Proteome Organization (HUPO) to create a standardized format for Mass Spectrometry data. This format is now deprecated, and replaced by mzML.

mzXML
mzXML is a XML (eXtensible Markup Language) based common file format for proteomics mass spectrometric data. This format was developed at the Seattle Proteome Center/Institute for Systems Biology while the HUPO-PSI was trying to specify the standardized mzData format, and is still in use in the proteomics community.

YAFMS 
Yet Another Format for Mass Spectrometry (YAFMS) is a suggestion to save data in four table relational server-less database schema with data extraction and appending being exercised using SQL queries.

mzML
As two formats (mzData and mzXML) for representing the same information is an undesirable state, a joint effort was set by HUPO-PSI, the SPC/ISB and instrument vendors to create a unified standard borrowing the best aspects of both mzData and mzXML, and intended to replace them. Originally called dataXML, it was officially announced as mzML. The first specification was published in June 2008. This format was officially released at the 2008 American Society for Mass Spectrometry Meeting, and is since then relatively stable with very few updates. 
On 1 June 2009, mzML 1.1.0 was released. There are no planned further changes as of 2013.

mzAPI 
Instead of defining new file formats and writing converters for proprietary vendor formats a group of scientists proposed to define a common application program interface to shift the burden of standards compliance to the instrument manufacturers' existing data access libraries.

mz5 
The mz5 format addresses the performance problems of the previous XML based formats. It uses the mzML ontology, but saves the data using the HDF5 backend for reduced storage space requirements and improved read/write speed.

imzML
The imzML standard was proposed to exchange data from mass spectrometry imaging in a standardized XML file based on the mzML ontology. It splits experimental data into XML and spectral data in a binary file. Both files are linked by a universally unique identifier.

mzDB 
mzDB saves data in an SQLite database to save on storage space and improve access times as the data points can be queried from a relational database.

Toffee
Toffee is an open lossless file format for data-independent acquisition mass spectrometry. It leverages HDF5 and aims to achieve file sizes similar to those from the proprietary and closed vendor formats.

mzMLb
mzMLb is another take on using a HDF5 backend for performant raw data saving. It, however, preserves the mzML XML data structure and stays compliant to the existing standard.

Proprietary formats
Below is a table of different file format extensions.

{|class="wikitable sortable" width="75%"
! align="left"| Company
! align="left" |Extension
! align="left" |File type
|-
|ACD/Labs
|*.spectrus
|Imports LC/MS and GC/MS data from most major instrument vendors listed here
|-
|AgilentBruker
|.D (folder)
|Agilent MassHunter, Agilent ChemStation, or Bruker BAF/YEP/TDF data format

|-
|Agilent/Bruker
|.YEP
|instrument data format

|-
|Agilent
|.AEV, .ASR
|ASCII Report format (for Analytical Studio Reviewer)

|-
|Bruker
|.BAF
|instrument data format

|-
|Bruker
|.FID
|instrument data format

|-
|Bruker
|.TDF
|timsTOF instrument data format

|-
|ABI/Sciex 
|.WIFF
|instrument data format

|-
|ABI/Sciex 
|.t2d
|4700 and 4800 file format

|-
|Waters
|.PKL 
|MassLynx peak list format

|-
|ThermoPerkinElmer
|.RAW*
|Thermo XcaliburPerkinElmer TurboMass

|-
|Micromass**/Waters
|.RAW* (folder)
|Waters MassLynx

|-
|ChromtechFinnigan***VG
|.DAT
|Finnigan ITDS file format; MAT95 instrument data formatMassLab data format

|-
|Finnigan***
|.MS
|ITS40 instrument data format

|-
|Shimadzu
|.QGD 
|GCMSSolution format

|-
|Shimadzu
|.qgd
|instrument data format

|-
|Shimadzu
|.lcd
|QQQ/QTOF instrument data format

|-
|Shimadzu
|.spc 
|library data format

|-
|Bruker/Varian
|.SMS
|instrument data format

|-
|Bruker/Varian
|.XMS
|instrument data format
|-
|ION-TOF
|.itm
|raw measurement data
|-
|ION-TOF
|.ita
|analysis data
|-
|Physical Electronics/ULVAC-PHI
|.raw*
|raw measurement data
|-
|Physical Electronics/ULVAC-PHI
|.tdc
|spectrum data
|}
(*) Note that the RAW formats of each vendor are not interchangeable; software from one cannot handle the RAW files from another.
(**) Micromass was acquired by Waters in 1997
(***) Finnigan is a division of Thermo

Software

Viewers
There are several viewers for mzXML, mzML and mzData: MZmine, PEAKS, Insilicos, MS-Spectre, TOPPView (mzXML, mzML and mzData), Spectra Viewer, SeeMS, msInspect, jmzML, Mascot Distiller, Elsci Peaksel

There is a viewer for ITA images. ITA and ITM images can be parsed with the pySPM python library.

Converters
Known converters for mzData to mzXML: 
Hermes: A Java "mzData, mzXML, mzML" converter to all directions: publicly available, runs with a graphical user interface, by the Institute of Molecular Systems Biology, ETH Zurich
FileConverter: A command line tool that converts to/from various mass spectrometry formats, part of TOPP
Known converters for mzXML: 
 The Institute for Systems Biology maintains a list of converters
Known converters for mzML: 
msConvert: A command line tool converting to/from various mass spectrometry formats. A GUI is also available for Windows users.   
 ReAdW: The Institute for Systems Biology command line converter for Thermo RAW files, part of the TransProteomicPipeline. The latest update of this tool was made in September 2009. Users are now redirected by the TPP development team to use the msConvert software (see above). 
FileConverter: A command line tool that converts to/from various mass spectrometry formats, part of TOPP
Converters for proprietary formats:
msConvert: A command line tool converting to/from various mass spectrometry formats including multiple proprietary formats. A GUI is also available for Windows users.   
 CompassXport, Bruker's free tool generating mzXML (and now mzData) files for many of their native file formats (.baf).
 MASSTransit, a software to change data between proprietary formats, by Palisade Corporation and distributed by Scientific Instrument Services, Inc and PerkinElmer. Purchased from Palisade by John Wiley and Sons in 2020 and incorporated into KnowItAll Spectroscopy software.(list of file formats supported).
 Aston, native support for several Agilent Chemstation, Agilent Masshunter and Thermo Isodat file formats
 unfinnigan, native support for Finnigan (*.RAW) file formats
 OpenChrom, an open source software with support to convert various native file formats including its own open .ocb format to store chromatograms, peaks and identification results
Currently available converters are :
 MassWolf, for Micromass MassLynx .Raw format
 mzStar, for SCIEX/ABI SCIEX/ABI Analyst format
 wiff2dta for SCIEX/ABI SCIEX/ABI Analyst format to mzXML, DTA, MGF and PMF

See also 
Mass spectrometry software

References 

Bioinformatics software
Mass spectrometry software
Proteomics